Douglas William Paul Lozito (born March 7, 1962 in New York City), known professionally as Doug Holland, is an American musician who played guitar and wrote songs for New York Hardcore Punk bands Kraut and Cro-Mags. He was a bartender and manager at the A7 club in New York from 1981 until it closed in 1984.

References

External links 
 Doug Holland at Discogs

Living people
Place of birth missing (living people)
Guitarists from New York City
American male guitarists
1962 births